Absconditella is a genus of lichenised fungi in the family Stictidaceae. The genus was circumscribed in 1965 by Czech lichenologist Antonín Vězda, with Absconditella sphagnorum assigned as the type species. Absconditella is characterised by gyalectoid apothecia with a hymenium that is not amyloid, without a dark pigment and thalli containing green algae as photobionts. The genus name means "hidden", a reference to the scant structure of the thallus and its small apothecia.

Species
 Absconditella amabilis  – Canada
 Absconditella annexa 
 Absconditella antarctica  – Antarctica
 Absconditella baegasanensis 
 Absconditella celata  – Lappland
 Absconditella delutula 
 Absconditella duplicella 
 Absconditella fossarum 
 Absconditella lignicola 
 Absconditella pauxilla 
 Absconditella rosea  – South America
 Absconditella rubra  – Europe
 Absconditella sphagnorum 
 Absconditella termitariicola  – Brazil
 Absconditella trivialis 
 Absconditella viridithallina  – South America

References

Lichen genera
Ostropales
Ostropales genera
Taxa described in 1965
Taxa named by Antonín Vězda